In mathematics, the limit comparison test (LCT) (in contrast with the related direct comparison test) is a method of testing for the convergence of an infinite series.

Statement 

Proof 

Because  we know that for every  there is a positive integer  such that for all  we have that , or equivalently

 

 

 
As  we can choose  to be sufficiently small such that  is positive.
So  and by the direct comparison test, if  converges then so does .

Similarly , so if  diverges, again by the direct comparison test, so does .

That is, both series converge or both series diverge.

Example

We want to determine if the series  converges.  For this we compare it with the convergent series 

As  we have that the original series also converges.

One-sided version 

One can state a one-sided comparison test by using limit superior. Let  for all .

Example 

Now 
 does not exist, so we cannot apply the standard comparison test. However, 
 and since  converges, the one-sided comparison test implies that  converges.

Converse of the one-sided comparison test 

Let  for all . If  diverges and  converges, then necessarily 
, that is, 
. The essential content here is that in some sense the numbers  are larger than the numbers .

Example 

Let  be analytic in the unit disc  and have image of finite area. Moreover, 
 diverges. Therefore, by the converse of the comparison test, we have
, that is,
.

See also
 Convergence tests
 Direct comparison test

References

Further reading
 Rinaldo B. Schinazi: From Calculus to Analysis. Springer, 2011, pp. 50
 Michele Longo and Vincenzo Valori: The Comparison Test: Not Just for Nonnegative Series. Mathematics Magazine, Vol. 79, No. 3 (Jun., 2006), pp. 205–210 (JSTOR)
 J. Marshall Ash: The Limit Comparison Test Needs Positivity. Mathematics Magazine, Vol. 85, No. 5 (December 2012), pp. 374–375 (JSTOR)

External links 
 Pauls Online Notes on Comparison Test 

Convergence tests
Articles containing proofs